Porizon is a genus of parasitoid wasps belonging to the family Ichneumonidae.

The species of this genus are found in Europe and Northern America.

Species:
 Porizon agilis Cresson 
 Porizon albistriae (Horstmann, 1987)

References

Ichneumonidae
Ichneumonidae genera